Benjamin or Ben Anderson may refer to:


Arts and entertainment
Ben Anderson (actor), Australian actor
Ben Anderson (journalist), television personality and reporter for the BBC
Benjamin Anderson (musician) (born 1974), American musician and songwriter
Benny Andersen (1929–2018), Danish poet
Benny Andersson (born 1946), Swedish musician and composer

Sports
Ben Anderson (footballer) (born 1946), Scottish footballer
Ben Anderson (rugby league) (born 1978), rugby league footballer of the 1990s
Bennie Anderson (born 1977), American football offensive guard
Benny F. Andersen (born 1963), Danish sailor

Other uses
Ben Anderson (entrepreneur) (born 1981), American entrepreneur
Benedict Anderson (1936–2015), professor emeritus of International Studies at Cornell University
Benjamin Anderson (1886–1949), American economist
Benjamin Anderson (soldier) (1836–1865), Confederate soldier
Benjamin Anderson (adventurer) (1834–1910), Liberian traveller, politician, and educator

See also
Ben Anderson Barrage, part of Queensland's irrigation system